Sardar Pur Noon is a town in Sargodha District, Punjab, Pakistan.

Populated places in Sargodha District